Saba Tavadze is a Georgian Football midfielder who currently plays for Iranian football club Esteghlal Khuzestan in the Persian Gulf Pro League.

References

1993 births
Living people
Footballers from Georgia (country)
Association football midfielders
Esteghlal Khuzestan F.C. players